Tatyana Kostromina (born 15 February 1973) is a female Belarusian table tennis player.

She competed at the 2008 Summer Olympics, reaching the third round of the singles competition. She also competed in the doubles competition in 2004.

She was born in Gomel, and resides there.

References

External links
2008 Olympic profile

1973 births
Living people
Belarusian female table tennis players
Table tennis players at the 2000 Summer Olympics
Table tennis players at the 2004 Summer Olympics
Table tennis players at the 2008 Summer Olympics
Olympic table tennis players of Belarus
Sportspeople from Gomel